Bakolalao Ramanandraibe Ranaivoharivony was Minister of Justice of Madagascar from October 2007 to 2009.

In 2006 she was director general of the École Nationale de la Magistrature et des Greffes.

She is honorary president of the Cour de Cassation and the Supreme Court.

References

Year of birth missing (living people)
Living people
Women government ministers of Madagascar
Ministers of Justice of Madagascar